The BDO (Bund Deutscher Orgelbaumeister, or Federation of German Master Organ Builders), established in 1895,  is a professional association of organ builders and related businesses located in Germany. Its membership currently includes over one hundred German workshops.

External links
BDO homepage

Professional associations based in Germany
Pipe organ organizations
Music organisations based in Germany